The following is a list of Malayalam films released in the year 2003.

Dubbed films

References 

 2003
2003
Lists of 2003 films by country or language
2003 in Indian cinema